Banana Flavored Milk is a South Korean milk beverage produced by Binggrae in Korea.

Name
The name "Banana Mat Uyu" in Korean translates as Banana Flavored Milk.

Flavor
The beverage consists of 80 percent milk. It contains just a hint of banana flavor. Other regular flavors include strawberry, melon, banana light, and coffee. Lychee,  peach, mandarin, mulberry, and pumpkin-sweet potato were or are currently seasonal flavors.

History
Since 1974, 800,000 bottles of Banana Flavored Milk are sold each day in Korea and around 5.3 billion bottles have been sold across the country as of 2010. According to Binggrae, 150 billion South Korean won worth of these bottles have been sold in 2014 alone. The bottle's design is said to be inspired by traditional Korean jars. According to the company, it initially came up with a polystyrene bottle to differentiate its product from glass bottles and plastic packages that were prevalent milk containers in 1970s. The bottle has an overhanging lip which prevents the milk from dripping onto the drinker's face. Banana Flavored Milk got its flavor because the Korean government wanted to encourage Korean citizens to drink more milk. At the time Binggrae introduced its product, bananas were expensive and considered a luxury. They believed consumers would be enticed to purchase their milk for a taste of the fruit.

Global selling
The banana-flavored milk was first exported to the U.S. and is sold over in countries including mainland China (+Hong Kong), Taiwan, Canada, New Zealand, Thailand, Malaysia, Vietnam, and Cambodia. It was launched in China in 2008 and increased its sales from 700 million Korean Won in 2010 and 15 billion in 2013. Many Thai consumers came to the Korean Pavilion of the Bangkok Food Fair held on May 31, 2017, to June 4, 2017, to taste this product.

References

External links

Milk-based drinks
Drink brands
South Korean drinks